Sean Garrison (October 19, 1937 – March 2, 2018) was an American film, television and theatre actor. He played Mark Dominic in the 1966 film Moment to Moment. Garrison also played The Culhane in the American western television series Dundee and the Culhane.

Life and career 
Garrison was born in New York, of Irish descent. At the age of five, his father died. At the age of nine, Garrison worked as a shoeshiner having his own shoeshine box, when a man asked him to sing the classic cowboy song "Home on the Range", while giving the man his shoeshine. After that, he decided to sing songs, primarily on holidays, singing from bar to bar. Garrison later retired from singing and began to work on a dairy farm in New York. When he was at the age of fifteen, Garrison had left high school, after which he was hired to take numerous jobs. 

Garrison had moved to south at Caribbean, after he figured out the way to live. In 1955, Garrison worked in a furniture and tile factory in California. Later a friend suggested that he work on television programs, being a film librarian at the television broadcasting network ABC. He received a contract with Warner Bros., paced from a western to another. Garrison began his film and television career in 1958, appearing in the film Darby's Rangers. Garrison later returned to New York, where he studied about drama at the New York Actors Studio, having a series of part-time jobs. While Garrison was in New York, he was married. In December 1959, he attracted several young mothers, while he was a Santa Claus at Gimbels department store, attracting young mothers of him as a hunky Father Christmas at the Macy's Department Store.

Garrison began looking for stage plays, later being discovered by the production of Camelot, touring in the Broadway play, in which he played the role of "Lancelot", doing over 300 performances. Garrison also starred in a Broadway play, titled, There Was a Little Girl, playing the role of "Neill Johns". In 1962, he was honored the Theatre World Award, for his performance on the Off-Broadway play Half-Past Wednesday, also appeared in his last Broadway play credit, titled, The Beauty Part, playing the role of "Rob Roy Fruitwell". Garrison was later divorced, having only one son, Torin.

In his film and television career, Garrison appeared in television programs, as his credits includes, Gunsmoke (in 1966 as a preacher torn by his cowardice in S11E23’s entry "Sanctuary"), The Rockford Files, Cheyenne, The Big Valley, Police Woman, The Adventures of Ozzie and Harriet, Buck Rogers in the 25th Century and Love, American Style. He also appeared in films, such as, Violent Road, Onionhead, Splendor in the Grass, Banning, Up Periscope and Midway.  In 1966, Garrison starred in the film Moment to Moment, where he played the role of "Mark Dominic". He also co-starred in the short-lived CBS western television program Dundee and the Culhane, in which Garrison starred with John Mills who played the role of "Dundee". He retired his career in 1981, in which Garrison later worked on a swimming pool construction.

Death 
Garrison died in March 2018, at the age of 80.

References

External links 

Rotten Tomatoes profile

1937 births
2018 deaths
People from New York (state)
Male actors from New York (state)
Shoeshiners
American male film actors
American male television actors
American male stage actors
20th-century American male actors
Western (genre) television actors
American people of Irish descent